Prince George was launched in 1828 at Newcastle upon Tyne. She was an East Indiaman, initially sailing under a license from the British East India Company (EIC). She made two voyages to South Australia, carrying 200 Prussian immigrants on the first. She was wrecked in July 1841 near Hong Kong.

Career
Captain Henry Wright, of South Shields, acquired Prince George on 27 May 1828. He moved to London in 1829 and transferred Prince Georges registry from Newcastle to London.

In 1813 the EIC had lost its monopoly on the trade between India and Britain. British ships were then free to sail to India or the Indian Ocean under a license from the EIC. Prince George first appeared in Lloyd's Register (LR) in 1830 with Donaldson, master, Wright, owner, and trade London–Ceylon. In 1835 Henry Wright moved back to Newcastle. Prince George was registered there on 6 January 1835.

On 31 July 1838 Captain Frederick Bigger Chilcott sailed from Hamburg, bound for Port Adelaide. She was under charter to George Fife Angas's  South Australia Company. She arrived at Port Adelaide on 18 November. She was transporting 207 passengers, consisting of Germans, including Pastor August Kavel, plus seven others (four adults and three children). The Germans were the first Prussian settlers to South Australia.

Prince George made a second voyage to South Australia. She sailed from Calcutta on 12 May 1839 and arrived at  Nepean Bay, South Australia on 2 September 1839.

Fate
On 21 August 1841 a typhoon developed at Macao and Hong Kong. Price George went to pieces but her crew was saved and taken aboard Queen.

Citations and references

References
 "Ships arriving in South Australia 1838", Pioneers Association of South Australia
 "Shipping Arrivals", South Australian Genealogy & Heraldry Society Inc
 "Prince George", Private homepage of Graeme Moad
 "Prince George (dep Hamburg) 1838", Private webpages of DIANE CUMMINGS
 

Barques
1828 ships
Ships built on the River Tyne
Age of Sail merchant ships of England
Maritime incidents in July 1841
Migrant ships to Australia